Podoserpula miranda is a species of fungus in the family Amylocorticiaceae. Found in New Caledonia, it was described in 2012.  Its common name is the Barbie pagoda fungus due to its brilliant pink color similar to cotton candy and multi-tiered appearance, with 3 to 6 pilea stacked one above the other and separated by about one-half inch (about one cm) of stem between pilea, and reaching a height of four inches (ten centimeters)  The species epithet  means 'wonderful' in Latin.

It grows in the soil and is associated with the Oak Gum (Arillastrum gummiferum).

References

External links

Amylocorticiales
Fungi described in 2013
Fungi of New Caledonia